Belinda Ang Saw Ean  (born 24 April 1954) is a Singaporean judge of the Court of Appeal. Ang received her Bachelor of Laws from the University of Wales, Aberystwyth in 1976 and her Master of Laws (with distinction) from the University College London. She was first appointed Judicial Commissioner in February 2002, Judge of the Supreme Court in January 2003, Judge of the Appellate Division of the Supreme Court in January 2021, and Justice of the Court of Appeal of the Supreme Court in November 2022. Prior to these appointments, she joined Godwin & Co in 1980 and was made junior partner in 1983. She founded Ang & Partners in 1985, and was appointed Senior Counsel in 1998. She is a member of the Senate and Executive Committee of the Singapore Academy of Law, and chairperson of the Singapore Mediation Centre.

References

Anglo-Chinese School alumni
Living people
Singaporean Christians
Singaporean people of Chinese descent
Singaporean Senior Counsel
Singaporean women judges
Singaporean women lawyers
20th-century Singaporean lawyers
Judges of the Supreme Court of Singapore
1954 births
20th-century women lawyers